Protroctopsocidae is a family of psocids in the order Psocodea. There are at least four genera and about five described species in Protroctopsocidae.

Genera
These four genera belong to the family Protroctopsocidae:
 Chelyopsocus Lienhard, 1980
 Philedaphia Lienhard, 1995
 Protroctopsocus Mockford, 1967
 Reticulopsocus Lienhard, 2005

References

Further reading

 

Troctomorpha